Zabihollah Poorshab (also Romanized as "Zabīhollāh Pūrsheib"; born 18 July 1988 in Sirvan) more commonly known as Zabihollah Poursheib is an Iranian karateka. Poursheib competed at the 2010 Asian Games at the 84 kg division and won the gold medal. He also won the bronze medal in 2016 World Karate Championships.

References

External links 
 Zabihollah Poursheib Profile in Karate Records

1986 births
Living people
Iranian male karateka
Asian Games gold medalists for Iran
Asian Games bronze medalists for Iran
Asian Games medalists in karate
Karateka at the 2010 Asian Games
Karateka at the 2018 Asian Games
Medalists at the 2010 Asian Games
Medalists at the 2018 Asian Games
World Games gold medalists
Competitors at the 2017 World Games
World Games medalists in karate
20th-century Iranian people
21st-century Iranian people
Islamic Solidarity Games competitors for Iran